Laminacauda fuegiana is a species of sheet weaver found in Chile and the Falkland Islands. It was described by Tullgren in 1901.

References

Linyphiidae
Fauna of Chile
Spiders of South America
Spiders described in 1901